Eduardo Bustos (born 23 April 1937) is a former Colombian cyclist. He competed in the 1000m time trial and Men's sprint events at the 1964 Summer Olympics.

References

1937 births
Living people
Colombian male cyclists
Olympic cyclists of Colombia
Cyclists at the 1964 Summer Olympics
Place of birth missing (living people)